The Mayor of Easton, Pennsylvania is a political position dating from 1887, arising from the ascension of the Borough of Easton into the city of Easton. In 1972 the city adopted a strong mayor government, and in 2007 the people of Easton voted to give the mayor a seat on the city council.

Mayors of Easton

References